Sylvia Masebo (born March 7, 1963) is a Zambian entrepreneur, politician, and National Assembly of Zambia representative for Chongwe constituency with the United Party for National Development (UPND). Sylvia Masebo holds a degree in Banking and Finance. She first stood on the ticket of Zambian Republican Party (ZRP) in 2001, then the Movement for Multi-Party Democracy (MMD) in 2003, then the Patriotic Front (PF) in 2011, and then the UPND in 2021.

Political career 
Sylvia Masebo came to public prominence in the 1990s as Deputy Mayor of Lusaka and MMD Deputy Treasurer. Even before the mass defections from the MMD in response to Chiluba’s third-term ambitions, Masebo had led a large group of dissatisfied MMD members out of the party. By the time of the 2001 elections, she had joined the newly established Zambia Republican Party (ZRP), headed by former Minister of Defence Ben Mwila. On the ZRP ticket, she was elected as a parliamentarian in Chongwe Constituency. 

In 2003, Masebo was one of the opposition parliamentarians who were co-opted by Mwanawasa into his Cabinet, becoming Minister for Local Government and Housing. In 2005, she was transferred to Health to succeed Chituwo. Masebo was instrumental in politically defending the reversal of the health reforms in Parliament. Her tenure, however, was cut short when she decided to formally cross over to the MMD, forcing her to vacate her seat in Parliament and her ministerial position. This allowed her, however, to defend her seat on an MMD ticket in the 2006 elections. Following the elections, she returned to her old post as Minister of Local Government, which she held until Banda came to power in 2008. She failed to be appointed minister for opposing Banda’s succession of Mwanawasa. By the time of the 2011 elections, she had joined Michael Sata’s camp but failed to retain her parliamentary seat.

However, there was a by-election in November 2011 just 3 months after the general election, necessitated by Japhen Mwakalombe's resignation from the MMD. Sylvia Masebo stood again for the Patriotic Front in Chongwe Constituency, which she won.

During Michael Sata's tenure, she served as Ministry of Tourism and Arts until March 20, 2014.

In July 2015, the Anti-Corruption Commission arrested Ms. Masebo and charged her with two counts of abuse of authority of office when she served as minister of Tourism and Arts. It was alleged that Ms. Masebo cancelled the procurement of a tender process of the Zambia Wildlife Authority (ZAWA) hunting concession. She was acquitted of the charges.

Ahead of the 2016 general election, Sylvia Masebo decided to stand for Chongwe again, this time as the United Party for National Development candidate. After losing her seat to Japhen Mwakalombe (who now stood for her previous party, the Patriotic Front), she decided to appeal the results, which was unsuccessful.

In the 2021 general election, she stood again as the United Party for National Development candidate for Chongwe, which she won. It was the fourth time that she was elected as the Chongwe Member of Parliament. She was then chosen as Zambia's Health minister for the second time by the newly-voted President Hakainde Hichilema after being appointed firstly in October 2005.

References

1963 births
Living people
Members of the National Assembly of Zambia
Movement for Multi-Party Democracy politicians
United Party for National Development politicians
Patriotic Front (Zambia) politicians
Health ministers of Zambia
Local government ministers of Zambia
Tourism ministers of Zambia
Women government ministers of Zambia
21st-century Zambian women politicians
21st-century Zambian politicians
People from Lusaka Province